Bivolje is a village in the city of Kruševac, Serbia. According to the 2011 census, it has a population of 275.

References

Populated places in Rasina District